Iran's National Orchestra is a national orchestra of Iran, which was founded in 1998 under the conduction of Farhad Fakhreddini.

The orchestra had been formed by Persian traditional instruments, strings and woodwind instruments. During its history, INO was focused on Persian composers compositions.

In the Orchestra's debut concert at Roodaki Great Hall in Tehran, works by Ali Tajvidi, Farhad Fakhreddini and Hossein Alizadeh were performed and Mohammad Reza Shajarian was the singer.

The Iran National Orchestra also performed outside of Iran, in Switzerland and Kuwait.

The Orchestra was dissolved in October 2012, reportedly because of financial problems. However later it formed again, and performed multiple times in the coming years. In April 27, 2019, it performed some epic and national Iranian songs at Kerman’s Ganjali Khan Square. In March 14, 2022, it performed "New Century Song" in Vahdat Hall in Tehran, and in December 4, 2022, it performed in Tehran on the occasion of International Volunteer Day.

Singers 
 Mohammadreza Shajarian
 Alireza Eftekhari 
 Mohammad Motamedi
 Alireza Ghorbani
 Mohammad Esfahani
 Hosein alishapour

See also
Tehran Symphony Orchestra
Iranian Orchestra for New Music
Melal Orchestra (Nations Symphony Orchestra)

References

External links
Associated Press confuses Iran National Orchestra with Tehran Symphony Orchestra!
Iran national orchestra disbanded for lack of funds, musicians say
Iran's National Orchestra in Geneva
Iran's National Orchestra and its background in Iran

Musical groups established in 1998
Musical groups disestablished in 2012
National Orchestra
National Orchestra
National orchestras
Disbanded orchestras
1998 establishments in Iran
2012 disestablishments in Iran